Pierre Paris (born 10 June 1947) is a Swiss judoka. He competed in the men's heavyweight event at the 1972 Summer Olympics.

References

1947 births
Living people
Swiss male judoka
Olympic judoka of Switzerland
Judoka at the 1972 Summer Olympics
Place of birth missing (living people)